Manzo'd with Children is an American reality television series aired on Bravo that debuted on October 5, 2014. It's a spin-off to The Real Housewives of New Jersey. The series features The Real Housewives of New Jersey cast member Caroline Manzo and follows her and her family's journey and endeavors as she spends the majority of her time managing the household.

Series overview

Episodes

Season 1 (2014)

Season 2 (2015)

Season 3 (2016)

References

External links 

 
 
 

Lists of American non-fiction television series episodes
Lists of reality television series episodes
The Real Housewives spin-offs